The 2019 Ashfield District Council election took place on 2 May 2019, to elect all members of Ashfield District Council in England.

The election resulted in the Ashfield Independents gaining control of the council with a large majority, winning 30 of the 35 seats up for election. The Labour Party suffered heavy losses, winning just 2 seats, a decrease of 20 compared with the last election in 2015.

Overall election results

Ashfield District Council (Summary of Overall Results)

|}

Ashfield District Council - Results by Ward

Abbey Hill

Annesley & Kirkby Woodhouse

Ashfields

Carsic

Central & New Cross

Hucknall Central

Hucknall North

Hucknall South

Hucknall West

Conservative hold

Huthwaite & Brierley

Jacksdale

Kingsway

Kirkby Cross & Portland

Larwood

Leamington

Selston

Skegby

St Marys

Stanton Hill & Teversal

Summit

Sutton Junction & Harlow Wood

The Dales

Underwood

By-elections

Annesley and Kirkby Woodhouse

Skegby

Hucknall Central

References

2019 English local elections
May 2019 events in the United Kingdom
2019
2010s in Nottinghamshire